= Virgins! =

Canadian web series

virgins! is a Canadian dramatic comedy web-series that premiered on CBC Gem on September 27, 2022. The show follows Aby (the Analytical-Intellectual virgin), Amina (the Apprehensive-Queer virgin), Delina (the Bride-of-Christ virgin), and Sara (the Family-Honour virgin), as they navigate life in their 20's as virgins in Toronto, Ontario. Series showrunner and producer Aden Abebe created the web-series back in 2018 inspired by her experiences growing up as an East African woman in Toronto. The series stars Nadia Hussein as Sara, Hosaena Mesfin as Aby, Nasra Adem as Amina and Blane Solomon as Delina.

== Episodes ==
Episode No.	Title	Directed By	Written By/ Teleplay By
1	"Started from the Bottom"	Sam MacAdams	Aden Abebe
2	"Dreams Money Can Buy"	Jackie Batsinduka	Rodas Dechassa
3	"One Dance"	Sam MacAdams	Teleplay by: Surer Deria
4	"Work"	Jackie Batsinduka	Teleplay by: Surer Deria
5	"Signs"	Reem Morsi	Aden Abebe
6	"God's Plan"	Lu Asfaha	Rodas Dechassa
7	"In My Feelings"	Lu Asfaha	Aden Abebe & Rodas Dechassa
8	"Worst Behaviour"	Lu Asfaha	Rodas Dechassa
9	"Trust Issues"	Sam MacAdams	Aden Abebe (Teleplay by: Surer Deria)
10	"Nice For What"	Reem Morsi	Aden Abebe
